Narbutt and Narbut are Polish-language forms and Narbutas is the Lithuanian-language form of the same noble family name from the Polish–Lithuanian Commonwealth times.

Historical Polish feminine forms are  Narbutowa, Narbutówna (possessive forms from "Narbut")

The surname may refer to:

Teodor Narbutt, Polish writer and historian
Ludwik Narbutt, Polish military commander
Aleksander Narbutt-Łuczyński, Polish lawyer and military officer
Heorhiy Narbut, Ukrainian graphic designer, also known as George Narbut
Vladimir Narbut, Russian poet
Ona Narbutienė, Lithuanian musicologist and educator
Onutė Narbutaitė, Lithuanian composer